Louella Brooke Tomlinson (born 8 April 1988) is an Australian former professional basketball player. She retired in June 2021.

Early life and career
Tomlinson was born and raised in the Melbourne suburb of Fitzroy, Victoria. She moved to Canberra in 2004 on a scholarship to the Australian Institute of Sport (AIS) and attended Lake Ginninderra College. Tomlinson debuted in the WNBL with the AIS during the 2004–05 season, but played minimal minutes in her first season. She played a further two seasons with the AIS before departing to play college basketball in the United States.

College career
Between 2007 and 2011, Tomlinson played at Saint Mary's College of California. As a senior (fourth and final season) with the Gaels in 2010–11, she averaged 14.1 points, 9.5 rebounds, 2.5 assists and 4.7 blocks in 32 games. She earned conference Defensive Player of the Year honours two times, and first-team All-West Coast Conference honours three times. Tomlinson ended her U.S. college career as the sole leader in career blocks in NCAA Division I women's basketball with 663, and the joint leader in career D-I triple-doubles alongside former Penn State star Suzie McConnell with 7. The blocks record fell during the 2012–13 season to Baylor's Brittney Griner, who finished her college career with 748. The triple-doubles record fell to Oregon's Sabrina Ionescu, who surpassed the career record as a sophomore (second-year player) in 2017–18 and ended her college career in 2020 with 26.

Saint Mary's statistics
Source

Professional career

WNBL
Tomlinson returned to Australia to begin her professional career, joining the Dandenong Rangers for the 2011–12 WNBL season. In 22 games on the season, she averaged 3.1 points and 2.9 rebounds per game, helping the Rangers win the championship alongside Jenna O'Hea and Kathleen MacLeod. Tomlinson returned to Australia for the 2014–15 WNBL season, moving to Perth to join the West Coast Waves. An injury plagued season limited her to just 12 games, averaging 12.4 points and 6.0 rebounds per game. The fledgeling Waves managed just four wins in 2014–15, prompting Basketball WA to sell the team to the Perth Wildcats. The team was subsequently rebranded the Perth Lynx and Tomlinson signed on with the new program. On 17 October 2015, she scored a career-high 29 points against the Melbourne Boomers, which earned her a spot on the Round 2 WNBL Team of the Week. On 13 January 2016, she was ruled out for four to six weeks with an ankle injury. She returned to the line-up for the team's final three games of the regular season, helping the Lynx finish second on the ladder with a 16–8 win–loss record. The Lynx went on to defeat the first-seeded Townsville Fire in the semi-finals, thus advancing to the WNBL grand final for the first time since 1999. There they were outclassed by the defending champion Townsville (who made it to the grand final via the preliminary final), losing the best-of-three series 2–0. In 23 games for the Lynx in 2015–16, she averaged 9.0 points, 5.3 rebounds, 1.4 assists and 2.0 blocks per game. Tomlinson will return home to Victoria after a year abroad in Europe, after signing with the Melbourne Boomers for the 2017–18 WNBL season.

After two one-season stints in Bendigo and Southside respectively, Tomlinson then signed with the Adelaide Lightning for the 2020–21 season.

Europe
For the 2012–13 season, Tomlinson played in Italy for Napoli Basket where she averaged 14.7 points, 12.9 rebounds, 2.1 steals and 3.4 blocks in 29 games. She moved to Hungary for the 2013–14 season, joining PINKK-Pécsi 424. She helped her Hungarian club win the league championship behind averages of 14.2 points, 6.0 rebounds, 1.6 assists and 2.7 blocks per game. In July 2016, Tomlinson signed with Campus Promete Logrono of the Spanish Liga Femenina de Baloncesto. However, her tenure was short lived as then she returned to Hungary after signing with Diósgyőri VTK for the remainder of the 2016–17 season.

See also
 List of NCAA Division I women's basketball career blocks leaders
 List of NCAA Division I basketball career triple-doubles leaders

References

External links
WNBL player piece on Tomlinson

1988 births
Living people
Australian expatriate basketball people in the United States
Australian women's basketball players
Centers (basketball)
Perth Lynx players
Saint Mary's Gaels women's basketball players
Universiade medalists in basketball
Universiade bronze medalists for Australia
Medalists at the 2009 Summer Universiade
Medalists at the 2011 Summer Universiade